Guichi District is a district of the city of Chizhou, Anhui province, People's Republic of China and the seat of the city government. The district has a population of 636,000 and an area of .It was called Guichi City before 2000.

Administration
As of 2011, Guichi District has jurisdiction over 11 subdistricts and 9 towns.

Subdistricts

Towns

Transport 
China National Highway 318

External links
Government site of Guichi  (in Simplified Chinese)

References

County-level divisions of Anhui
Chizhou